Negar Mortazavi (Persian: نگار مرتضوی; born 1981) is an Iranian-American journalist, political analyst, editor and host of the Iran Podcast. She is based in Washington DC.

Early life 
Mortazavi was born in Tehran, Iran. She immigrated to the United States in 2002 as a student. She received a Bachelor of Arts from the University of Massachusetts and a Master of Arts from Brandeis University. Since 2009 she has been forced into exile from the Iranian regime because of her journalism work.

Career 

Mortazavi is considered a leading expert on Iran and US-Iran relations and frequently appears on media outlets including CNN, MSNBC, BBC, PRI, Aljazeera, and international outlets across Europe, Asia, and the Middle East. Her writing and commentary has appeared in Foreign Policy magazine, the Guardian, the Independent, and Huffington Post among others.  

Mortazavi is frequently invited to speak about Iran at think tanks and academic institutions has spoken at Princeton University, University of Chicago, University of Michigan, Johns Hopkins University, American University, University of Maryland, the Middle East Institute (MEI), and the school of the New York Times at Georgetown University.

Mortazavi worked as a TV reporter and presenter at Voice of America's Persian and English services from 2010 to 2014, where she hosted a daily talkshow on current affairs named Straight Talk (Rooye Khat) and interviewed prominent figures including boxing champion Muhammad Ali, former American hostage in Iran Sarah Shourd, former U.S. Under Secretary of Treasury David Cohen, former United States Persian Spokesperson Alan Eyre, and many others.

Mortazavi previously worked for the International Center for Journalists, the National Iranian American Council, and the United Nations headquarters in New York.

In 2014, she launched a unique kickstarter campaign and crowdfunded her travel to Brazil on assignment where she covered Iran's Team Melli presence in the FIFA World Cup live on Twitter.

Human rights and press freedom organizations including Article19, Committee to Protect Journalists (CPJ), and the Center for Women in Journalism (CFWIJ) have reported that Mortazavi and multiple other prominent female journalists and analysts in the Iranian diaspora have been victims of targeted online harassment, smear campaigns, and physical threats and persecution to themselves and their families, both from the Iranian regime and from some Iranian opposition groups abroad. Mortazavi has been the target of many state-sponsored hacking attempts of her online and social media accounts.

Recognition 
In 2021 Mortazavi was featured in Forbes among 30 inspirational women.

In 2021 Mortazavi was named a national security & foreign affairs leader by the Center For Strategic and International Studies (CSIC) based in Washington DC.

Mortazavi was named among 40 leaders under the age of 40 who are shaping the present and future of US-Middle East relations by the Middle East Policy Council in Washington DC.

In 2020 Mortazavi was named a MENA-American next generation leader in foreign policy and national security by New America Foundation in New York.

In 2017 Mortazavi was named a European Young Leader by Friends of Europe, a prominent progressive think tank based in Brussels, Belgium.

In 2014, The Guardian newspaper named her one of the top ten people to follow on Twitter for Iran news and commentary.

References

External links
 Negar Nortazavi at The Independent
 Iran Podcast with Negar Nortazavi
 Negar Nortazavi on Twitter

Living people
1981 births
American women journalists
Brandeis University alumni
University of Massachusetts alumni
People from Tehran
Iranian emigrants to the United States
Voice of America people